Ralph Lee "Mac" McCaughan (born July 12, 1967) is an American musician and record label owner, based in North Carolina. His main musical projects have been Superchunk since 1989 and Portastatic since the early 1990s. In 1989 he founded the independent record label Merge Records with Superchunk bandmate Laura Ballance.

Musical history
McCaughan is a founding member of the rock band Superchunk. Formed in 1989, they are one of the bands that helped define the Chapel Hill music scene of the 1990s. Their energetic, high-velocity style and do-it-yourself ethics is influenced by punk rock. The band released a string of full-length albums and compilations throughout the ‘90s. After releasing their eighth studio album in 2001, the band went into a period of reduced activity. In 2010, the band released a new studio album Majesty Shredding and followed it up in 2013 with their tenth studio album, I Hate Music.

He also heads the band Portastatic, which began as a lo-fi side project from Superchunk and has blossomed into his main musical project. Prior to this, he was the head of another lo-fi band named Bricks with Andrew Webster of Tsunami, Josh Phillips and Laura Cantrell. Other bands he played with prior to Superchunk include Slushpuppies, Wwax and Metal Pitcher (with Ballance).

In the early 1990s he was also the original drummer in the band Seam, which was formed in 1991 with former Bitch Magnet front man Sooyoung Park. He played on their debut album Headsparks and the Kernel EP.

In 2002, McCaughan teamed up with Robert Pollard of Guided By Voices to form the group Go Back Snowball. The duo recorded and released an album in 2002, titled Calling Zero. In the same year, he composed the score for Matt Bissonnette and Steven Clark's film Looking for Leonard.

Merge Records
Along with his Superchunk band mate Laura Ballance, he founded the successful independent record label Merge Records in 1989 as a way to release music from Superchunk and music created by friends. The label has expanded to include artists from around the world and records reaching the top of the Billboard music charts, including the highly successful band Arcade Fire.

McCaughan was a co-contributor to the book Our Noise - The Story of Merge Records by John Cook, released in 2009.

Other activity
On October 24, 2007, McCaughan gave expert witness testimony in the U.S. Senate Commerce Committee on the topic "The Future of Radio".

Personal life
McCaughan lives in Chapel Hill, North Carolina with his wife and children. He graduated from Columbia College of Columbia University in 1990.

Discography

Superchunk

 Superchunk (1990)
 No Pocky for Kitty (1991)
 On the Mouth (1993)
 Foolish (1994)
 Here's Where the Strings Come In (1995)
 Indoor Living (1997)
 Come Pick Me Up (1999)
 Here's to Shutting Up (2001)
 Majesty Shredding (2010)
 I Hate Music (2013)
  What a Time to Be Alive (2018)
 Foolish AF (2019)

Portastatic

All releases on Merge Records.
I Hope Your Heart Is Not Brittle (CD/LP) (1994)
Slow Note From a Sinking Ship (CD/LP) (1995)
The Nature of Sap (CD/LP) (1997)
Summer of the Shark (CD) (2003)
Bright Ideas (CD) (2005)
Be Still Please (CD) (2006)

Mac McCaughan

Non-Believers (CD/LP) (2015)
New Rain Duets (LP/digital) (with Mary Lattimore) (2019)

References

External links
portastatic - Mac McCaughan's blog
Superchunk - official website
Merge Records - official website

1967 births
Living people
American male singers
American rock singers
Singers from North Carolina
People from Chapel Hill, North Carolina
Merge Records
Superchunk members
Columbia College (New York) alumni